

Box office number-one films in 2011
This is a list of films which have placed number one at the weekend box office in the Republic of Ireland during 2011.

Top Grossing Films per total weekend gross

Films per No. 1 Box Office Placements

Distributors per No. 1 Box Office Placements

See also
 List of Irish films — Irish films by year

References

 

Ireland
2011 in Ireland
2011